István Magas (born 22 February 1952) is a Hungarian former water polo player who competed in the 1972 Summer Olympics.

He has been professor at the University of Connecticut, Storrs, Willamette University,   Texas Tech University,  and at the Corvinus University, Budapest, where between 2008-2012 he led the Department of World Economy.

His research interest is in international finance and patterns of globalization. He received the Doctor of Science degree from the Hungarian Academy of Sciences in 2013.

See also
 List of Olympic medalists in water polo (men)
 List of World Aquatics Championships medalists in water polo

References

External links
 
 

1952 births
Living people
Hungarian male water polo players
Hungarian economists
Olympic water polo players of Hungary
Water polo players at the 1972 Summer Olympics
Olympic silver medalists for Hungary
Olympic medalists in water polo
Willamette University faculty
Academic staff of the Corvinus University of Budapest
Medalists at the 1972 Summer Olympics